Monty Mobley Veazey (born March 31, 1954) was an American politician. He was a member of the Georgia House of Representatives from 1977 to 1983. He is a member of the Democratic party. He now serves as the President and CEO of the Georgia Alliance of Community Hospitals.

References

Living people
Democratic Party members of the Georgia House of Representatives
1954 births
People from Tifton, Georgia